Gymnasts are people who participate in the sport of gymnastics. This sport contains disciplines that include, but are not limited to:
{{columns-list|colwidth=22em|
 acrobatic gymnastics
 aerobic gymnastics<ref name="FIGAerobics">{{cite web|url=http://www.fig-gymnastics.com/vsite/vnavsite/page/directory/0,10853,5187-188475-205697-nav-list,00.html|title=Fédération Internationale de Gymnastique : About Aerobic|publisher=Fédération Internationale de Gymnastique|access-date=18 November 2012|quote=Aerobic has not only been a great form of physical training for the general public since the end of the 1980's, but also a top-level competitive sport. Aerobic Gymnastics presents dynamic moves, strength, flexibility, co-ordination and musicality in a routine, lasting up to 1 minute 50 seconds (1’30 for all categories from 2013).|archive-url=https://web.archive.org/web/20090323030420/http://www.fig-gymnastics.com/vsite/vnavsite/page/directory/0,10853,5187-188475-205697-nav-list,00.html|archive-date=2009-03-23|url-status=dead}}</ref>
 artistic gymnastics
 rhythmic gymnastics
 trampoline gymnastics
 tumbling}}
This list is of those who are considered to be notable in their chosen discipline.

See gymnasium (ancient Greece) for the origin of the word gymnast'' from gymnastikos.

Artistic gymnasts
 List of women's artistic gymnasts
 List of men's artistic gymnasts

Rhythmic gymnasts

Female (rhythmic)

Trampoline gymnasts

Female (trampoline)

Male (trampoline)

See also
International Gymnastics Hall of Fame
List of Olympic medalists in gymnastics (men)
List of Olympic medalists in gymnastics (women)
List of current female artistic gymnasts

Notes

References

External links
World Ranking (1952-2005)
Summary of Canadian Gymnastic Record
University of Michigan gymnasts

Gymnastics-related lists